Own Enemy is an Armenian romantic drama television series. The series premiered on Armenia TV on 2013. 
The series takes place in Yerevan, Armenia.

Premise
TV series about human destiny, friends that became enemies and about their descendants.
Due to cases and events in the background people may become friends and enemies.
Enemies, who share bread together, but deep inside they are evil and tactical.
A person can't control the time., but each of us is mighty to fight against the evil.

External links

 
 Own Enemy on Armenia TV

Armenian drama television series
Armenian-language television shows
2010s teen drama television series
Armenia TV original programming
2013 Armenian television series debuts
2010s Armenian television series
2015 Armenian television series endings